Real Monasterio de San Victorián is a monastery at the feet of Peña Montañesa, Sobrarbe, Aragon, Spain. It was established in the 11th century.

It is located in La Fueva municipal term, near Pueyo de Araguás.

King Ramiro I of Aragon made important donations to the monastery, including two families of slaves -that of Oriolus and his wife Elo, from Villa Alascore, and that of another man, wife and children, from Villa Luzares-, and their properties and their descendants, in perpetuity:

References 

Monasteries in Aragon
11th-century establishments in Spain
Christian monasteries established in the 11th century

Organisations based in Spain with royal patronage